Glenfield is a large village and former civil parish, now in the parish of Glenfields, in the Blaby district of Leicestershire, England. At the 2011 Census, Glenfields had a population of 9,643. Its located at the northwestern fringe of the city of Leicester. 

The village is directly to the west of Leicester and is just off junction 21A of the M1 motorway. It is the site of the headquarters of Leicestershire County Council, and of Leicestershire Fire and Rescue Service. It also gives its name to Glenfield Hospital, although the hospital is actually across the city border in Leicester.

The heart of the community is around the Square, with St Peter's Church (CofE), the church hall, the ruins of the former church, the Methodist Church and Hall and the public library (offering generous Internet access) just inside Station Road, and Park House (parish council), the Memorial Hall, Scout Hut, playground, Glenfield Primary School and the nursery school all located just inside Stamford Street.  The Hall County Primary School is located on Glenfield Frith Drive. Situated close to the Hall school is Faire Road commonly known for the row of shops situated there.

History
The name 'Glenfield' means 'clean field' possibly suggesting that it was clear of weeds.

Glenfield is mentioned in the Domesday Book of 1086, at which time it lay in Guthlaxton hundred and contained 12 households.

The village was greatly enlarged between the 1920s and the 1950s when the Faire Estate was built. In the 1980s and 1990s, another large estate was built on former farmland behind Ellis Park.

Glenfield was the site of the first station from Leicester West Bridge on the Leicester and Swannington Railway, opened on 17 July 1832 as the world's third steam railway. Just before reaching the station, the line passed through Glenfield Tunnel, which was built by Robert Stephenson and was, at 1 mile 36 yards, the world's longest railway tunnel at the time. The Glenfield end of the tunnel can still be seen.

On 1 April 1935 the parish was abolished to form "Glenfields". In 1931 the parish had a population of 1590.

Parish facilities

Glenfield has its own village newspaper, The Glenfield Gazette. The parish council own several areas of recreational land, including Ellis Park, Station Park and the Playing Fields. Near to the A50 and the boundary with Groby is the "Millennium Green", which is managed by a local trust. The Gynsills Nature Area can be found at the junction of Gynsill Lane and Stelle Way. A small area of mature trees and a pond, once part of the Gynsills Estate parkland, is now an area promoting biodiversity and nature conservation.

The area known as "The Square" was once more of a road and contained many more shops, mostly owned by the Stockley family. These were knocked down in the fifties and sixties to accommodate the roundabout and the maisonettes were built in place of the grocers, post office and butchers shop.

On Station Road, there is a large Co-Op petrol station, a pharmacy, and other shops. There are also shops around the Square, Stamford Street and Faire Road.
The Square has a butchers shop.

The Co-operative Food superstore on Station Road was closed down in January 2020 and was replaced with a Morrisons superstore which opened in August 2020 and the  Morrisons petrol station to open late February 2020.

There are a variety of pubs, take-aways, restaurants and a hotel in Glenfield. These include the Nag's Head, the Forge (formerly the Griffin), the Gynsills, and the Railway Inn (near to the site of the former Glenfield Station). There are Chinese, pizza and fish and chip takeaways, and Indian restaurants in the village. The parade of shops on Faire Road includes Aquarius Fish Bar, Golden Orient Chinese, and Sameeha Indian Restaurant and takeaway.

Notable residents
The Australian pioneer and explorer Charles Throsby was born in Glenfield in 1777. Stamford Street was the home of painter Bryan Organ. Salcombe Drive was the home of the pundit Graham Barnfield. Leicester Road was the home of  Alderman Bertram Powell Lord Mayor of Leicester 1959–60, from the late 1930s to his death in 1969. During the late 90s former Leicester City players Robbie Savage  and  Pontus Kåmark lived in Glenfield.
The British dramatist and playwright David Campton was a resident of Liberty Road, Glenfield up until his death in 2006. Footballers David Nugent and Chris Wood lived in Glenfield when playing for Leicester City in the mid-2010s.

Commercial
Although Glenfield is mainly residential there are a few businesses located in the area, notably the Widdowson Group and others located on the Mill Lane Industrial Estate. Next door to Mill lane is Optimus point, home to major brands such as Boden, Mattel, Everards and delivery company dpd.

Transport

Roads
The M1 can be easily accessed at Junction 21a to the south of the village (southbound only), which makes Fosse Shopping Park accessible. The M1 North can be reached in minutes along the A50 towards Markfield, Groby and Coalville.

The A46 leads around the north of Leicester, with access to Anstey and then the A6 to Loughborough.

Bus
The village is currently served by First Leicester service 13 and Centrebus 40 CircleLine buses.

References

External links

Villages in Leicestershire
Former civil parishes in Leicestershire
Blaby